Dallat is a surname. Notable people with the surname include:

John Dallat (1947–2020), Irish politician
Michael Dallat (1925–2000), Irish Roman Catholic bishop